Ahangar Kola (also Romanized as Āhangar Kolā; also known as Āhangarkalā-e Harāzpi) is a village in Ahlamerestaq-e Jonubi Rural District, in the Central District of Mahmudabad County, Mazandaran Province, Iran. At the 2006 census, its population was 204, in 45 families.

References 

Populated places in Mahmudabad County